FabricLive.38 is a DJ mix compilation album by DJ Craze, as part of the FabricLive Mix Series.

Track listing
  Craze - Intro Ft. Armanni Reign - Craze
  N.O.R.E. - Set It Off Ft. Swizz Beatz and J. Ru$$ - Babygrande
  The Cool Kids - I Rock - Chocolate Industries
  The Cool Kids - Black Mags - Chocolate Industries
  Bangers and Cash - Loose - Downtown
  Tuff Crew - My Part Of Town - Warlock
  Jan Hammer - Miami Vice Theme - Universal
 2 tracks mixed:
  Miami Jam Crew - Pretty Girls - Midtown
  DJ Blaqstarr - Shake It To The Ground Ft. Rye Rye (Acapella) - Mad Decent
  Lushus - Ho Fo Sho - Craze
  The Beat Club - Security - Warners
  Chromeo - Bonafied Lovin' (Eli Escobar Remix Ft. Pase Rock) - Back Yard
  Treasure Fingers - Cross The Dancefloor - Treasure Fingers
  DJ Blaqstarr - Supastarr - Mad Decent
  Coldcut - True Skool Ft. Roots Manuva (Switch Remix) - Ninja Tune
  Earth, Wind & Fire - Brazilian Rhyme - Sony
  Armand Van Helden - I Want Your Soul - Ministry Of Sound
  Debbie Deb - When I Hear Music - Pandisc
  Magic Mike - Magic Mike Cutz The Record - Cheetah
  Quadrant Six - Body Mechanic - Atlantic
  DJ Laz - Red Alert - Pandisc
  Fresh Celeste and M4 Sers - Give It All To me - JR Records
  Bangers And Cash - Shake That - "Downtown"
  The Pase Rock - Lindsay Lohan's Revenge (Klever Remix) - Fully Fitted
  Kazey & Bulldog - Big Truck - Dress-2-Sweat
  The Chemical Brothers - Get Yourself High (Switches Rely on Rub) - EMI
  Kid Sister - Pro Nails Rusko Remix feat. Kanye West - Fools Gold
  DJ Assault - Pushin' (Deekline, Wizard & Freq Nasty Mix) - Rat

References

External links
Fabric: FabricLive.38

Fabric (club) albums
2008 compilation albums